Wayne Gretzky is a retired National Hockey League player.

Gretzky may also refer to:
 Gretzky (surname) (Russian Грецкий), a Belarusian and Russian surname of Polish aristocratic origin
 Gretzky (album), an album by Electro Quarterstaff
 Wayne Gretzky Drive, a freeway in Edmonton, Canada
 Hlinka Gretzky Cup, an ice hockey tournament